Sinbulsan  is a mountain in South Korea. It extends over the cities of Ulsan and Yangsan in Gyeongsangnam-do. It is part of the Yeongnam Alps mountain range.

See also
 List of mountains in Korea
List of South Korean tourist attractions

Notes

References
 
 Photos and Map of hiking on MT Sinbulsan: http://www.everytrail.com/view_trip.php?trip_id=1993610

External links
 Official website for the Yeongnam Alps

Mountains of South Korea
Mountains of Ulsan
Tourist attractions in Ulsan
Mountains of South Gyeongsang Province